Schachen railway station may refer to:

 Schachen (Gais) railway station, in Gais, Appenzell Ausserrhoden, Switzerland
 Schachen (Herisau) railway station, in Herisau, Appenzell Ausserrhoden, Switzerland
 Schachen LU railway station, in Werthenstein, Lucerne, Switzerland